Sunkhani is a ward committee located in Kalinchowk Rural Municipality of Dolakha District in the Bagmati Province of north-eastern Nepal. Formally it was a Village Development Committee of Dolakha District. Sunkhani consists of two ward (7 and 8) committees. The office of Kalinchowk Rural Municipality also lies in Sunkhani ward number 08.

Shree Kalinag Temple, Chaughara Darbaar and Ganesh Pati are the much famous holy places in Sunkhani which are the popular destination of internal and external tourists. 

At the time of the 1991 Nepal census it had a population of 5,349. The village is connected to the district headquarter, Charikot by a roadway. 

Main Casts : Shiwakoti, Aacharya, Poudel, Pathak, Budhathoki

Schools/Colleges in Sunkhani : Shree Kalinag Secondary School, Kalinag Multiple College, Shree Devisthan Basic School, Shree Sitka Secondary School.

Health Posts : Sunkhani Health Post

Banks : Laxmi Bank Ex.

Co-Operatives : Kalinag Co-Operative, Anandadayik Bahu-Uddeshiya Co-Operative, Shringeshwor Co-Operative

Markets : Soti, Kalinag, Milldada, Bhadaure

Streets : Charikot-Lambagar Sadakkhanda, Thumka-Makaibari Road, Padekhala-Kalipokhari Road, 

Villages : Makaibari, Bhatteli, Mane-Bhatteli, Chisaapani, Nibare, Dhunge, Bhadaure, Chaparku, Sakhalbu, Malepu

Neighbouring Wards : Lapilang, Lamidada, Sundrawati

Neighbouring Municipalities : Bhimeshwor, Baiteshwor, Gaurishankar

Hills : Sringeswor Hill

Governmental Offices: Kalinchowk Rural Municipality Office, Ward Offices of Sunkhani

References

External links
UN map of the municipalities of Dolakha District

In Sunkhani specially Shiwakoti ( A caste of Brahmin) are living in majority.Kalinag temples,Chughara are the popular destination in this village.

Populated places in Dolakha District